Oliver Twist is a 1922 American silent drama film adaptation of Charles Dickens' 1838 novel Oliver Twist, featuring Lon Chaney as Fagin and Jackie Coogan as Oliver Twist. The film was directed by Frank Lloyd. It was selected as one of the best pictures of 1922 by New York Times, Chicago Tribune and the Los Angeles Times. Walter J. Israel handled the costuming. Studio interiors were filmed at the Robert Brunton Studios in Hollywood. The film's tagline was "8 Great Reels that make you ask for more. Will Hays says Jackie Coogan Films are the sort the World needs." A still exists showing Fagin training his wards to be pickpockets.

Coogan was at the height of his career during the filming, having played the title role in Charles Chaplin's The Kid the previous year.

Chaney was at the height of his career as the silent film's "Man of A Thousand Faces". He would play the title role the following year in The Hunchback of Notre Dame, and three years later The Phantom of the Opera.

Plot
During the 1830s, in a country workhouse somewhere in England, a very young woman outcast of unknown history dies giving birth to a boy. Nine years later, the boy in particular who has been given the unlikely name of Oliver Twist by the cruel parish beadle Mr. Bumble, after losing out in a secret draw with the other orphan boys, gets into trouble with the workhouse authorities for daring to asking for more supper - if you can call one pathetically small bowlful of gruel a supper (asking "Please, sir...I want some more?").

As a result, Mr. Bumble apprentices him off to Mr. Sowerberry, an uncaring undertaker who mistreats the boy so badly that one day he rebels for the first time in his life, then runs away to London to seek his fortune.  Shortly afterwards, Mr. Bumble is summoned to a private meeting with a sinister man calling himself Mr. Monks who inquires information about Oliver, and easily bribes the greedy official into yielding him a gold locket that was the only thing of value found on Oliver's mother after her death, as well as the only proof that she along with her son are actually from a wealthy family.  Mr. Monks charges Mr. Bumble to remain silent about their transaction and goes on to London to track Oliver down.

As for Oliver himself, on the road to London he is befriended by a cocky street urchin calling himself the Artful Dodger, who offers to take the orphan to his home which is located in one of the filthiest London slums.  There the Dodger and several other boys like him are living under the care of an odd and seemingly benign old Jewish miser named Fagin, who gladly takes Oliver in. Little does the innocent orphan suspect that his newfound benefactor is in reality a crafty local crime lord, who has taken all these boys to order to train them to steal and to pick pockets for him and his brutal, thieving partner-in-crime Bill Sikes.  Fagin subtly introduces Oliver to the world of crime, getting him to participate with the other boys in a deceptively innocent game in which they each have to pick handkerchiefs and other articles out of the old man's many great coat pockets without him feeling anything.  Oliver succeeds on his first try, and Fagin rewards him with a coin.

Shortly afterwards, Oliver meets Sikes' doxy Nancy who takes an instant liking to the boy on sight.  Eventually Oliver gets caught in his first pickpocketing mission, even though it is the Dodger and another boy who steal a handkerchief from a kindly old gentleman.  At his trial however, the victim Mr. Brownlow takes pity on the boy and arranges for him to be released into his custody.

At Mr. Brownlow's home located in one of the wealthier sections of London, Oliver experiences true kindness for the first time in his life.  Unfortunately fearing exposure, Fagin and Sikes have him tracked down and kidnapped through Nancy, who immediately regrets her part in the abduction.
 
During all this Mr. Monks finally tracks Oliver down to Fagin's den and hires Fagin and Sikes to help him prevent the secret of Oliver's parentage from coming to light, and tells him to keep the boy with the gang.  Nancy gets wind of their scheme though, and at the risk of her life arranges a midnight rendezvous at London Bridge with Mr. Brownlow, whom she informs about Monks and of his plans for Oliver, and arranges with him to rescue Oliver from the gang's clutches.  But her efforts are discovered by Fagin and Sikes, the latter brutally murdering her for interfering.

After a thrilling rooftop chase, Sikes accidentally hangs himself and Fagin is arrested by the police while Oliver is happily reunited with Mr. Brownlow, who successfully tracks Monks down.  Monks confesses that Oliver is his long lost step brother, and the true heir to a vast fortune left by their late father.  Oliver forgives Monks and persuades Mr. Brownlow, who has become his guardian, not to turn him over to the police.  His quest for love has ended in fulfilment.

Cast
 Jackie Coogan as Oliver Twist
 Lon Chaney as Fagin
 Edouard Trebaol as The Artful Dodger
 George Siegmann as Bill Sikes
 Gladys Brockwell as Nancy
 James A. Marcus as Mr. Bumble
 Aggie Herring as Mrs. Corney
 Nelson McDowell as Mr. Sowerberry
 Lewis Sargent as Noah Claypole
 Joan Standing as Charlotte
 Carl Stockdale as Mr. Monks 
 Taylor Graves as Charley Bates
 Lionel Belmore as Mr. Brownlow
 Florence Hale as Mrs. Bedwin
 Joseph Hazelton as Mr. Grimwig
 Gertrude Claire as Mrs. Maylie
 Esther Ralston as Rose Maylie
 Eddie Boland as Toby Crackit

Film Preservation
The film was considered lost, until a print surfaced in Yugoslavia in 1973. The print lacked English language intertitles, which were subsequently restored by Blackhawk Films with the help of Jackie Coogan and Sol Lesser, more than 50 years after it was made.

When the film was originally released in 1922, it had a music score specially created for it by Vaughn De Leath. In the 1970s, a new musical score by John Muri was added to the restored print, and it was released in 1975 at a special screening at Filmex in Los Angeles. Prints can be found at Blackhawk Films, the UCLA Film and Television Archive and the Library of Congress. The film is readily available on DVD.

DVD Release
On June 30, 2009, a Region Free DVD of the movie was released by Alpha Video.

Critical Comments
"Director Lloyd deserves credit for the manner in which he has handled the production, in the sets, the selection of types and the preservation of the atmosphere of this novel...Jackie Coogan is ideal as Oliver Twist, and shows that he is a sterling little actor...Lon Chaney is fine as Fagin, though this role has been somewhat subordinated; his make-up and acting are exceptional." ---Moving Picture World

"Although there are a number of names with picture value in the supporting cast, there is hardly anything in their performance that stands out. They appear to be rather lacking when weighed against some of the stage characterizations that have been presented of the better known roles of the Dickens work. This is particularly true of the interpretation of Fagin presented by Lon Chaney and the Bill Sikes of George Siegmann." ---Variety

"Charming, delightful, thoroughly Dickens...(Fagin) was at times too theatrically portrayed by Lon Chaney. This is a picture that the entire industry can well be proud of." ---Film Daily

"The result is a motion picture thoroughly worthwhile and of very definite appeal...Lon Chaney who is these days adding rapidly to his fame as a real character genius, makes Fagin one of the most impressive of his gallery of portraits." ---Exhibitors Trade Review

"They've done a good job, an excellent job, with Dickens in the picturized Oliver Twist, and destined to keep the house full, if the crowds that packed the place yesterday mean anything. But whether it is Mr. Dickens or little Jackie Coogan that is drawing them in, of course, is a question. There's Fagin too, vividly present in the person of Lon Chaney." ---New York Times.

"The GREATEST FILM TRIUMPH of the DECADE. A MATCHLESS CAST of SCREEN CELEBRITIES SUPPORTING JACKIE in THIS, HIS FINEST ACHIEVEMENT. Starring the GREATEST BOY ACTOR in the WORLD!" ---The Wyoming County Times, N.Y.

See also
 List of rediscovered films

References

External links 

 
 
 
 
 poster for Oliver Twist
 Oliver Twist at Virtual History

1922 films
Films based on Oliver Twist
American silent feature films
American black-and-white films
Films directed by Frank Lloyd
Films about orphans
Articles containing video clips
First National Pictures films
1920s rediscovered films
Films produced by Sol Lesser
Films set in London
American historical drama films
1920s historical drama films
Rediscovered American films
1920s American films
Silent American drama films